Samuel Prentiss (March 31, 1782January 15, 1857) was an associate justice and chief justice of the Vermont Supreme Court, a United States senator from Vermont and a United States district judge of the United States District Court for the District of Vermont.

Education and career
Born on March 31, 1782, in Stonington, Connecticut, Prentiss moved with his family to Worcester, Massachusetts, and then to Northfield, Massachusetts, in 1786, completed preparatory studies and was instructed in the classics by private tutor Reverend Samuel C. Allen. He studied law in Northfield with attorney Samuel Vose, and Brattleboro, Vermont, with attorney John W. Blake in 1802. He was admitted to the bar and practiced in Montpelier, Vermont, from 1803 to 1824.

He was a member of the Vermont House of Representatives from 1824 to 1825. He was an associate justice of the Vermont Supreme Court from 1825 to 1829, and chief justice from 1829 to 1830.

Political affiliations and unsuccessful candidacy
In addition to practicing law, Prentiss became active in politics, first as a Federalist, and later as a National Republican and Whig. He was an unsuccessful candidate for the United States House of Representatives in 1816.

Congressional service
Prentiss was elected in 1831 to the United States Senate as a National Republican.  He was reelected as a Whig in 1837 and served from March 4, 1831, to April 11, 1842, when he resigned to accept a judicial appointment. He was Chairman of the Committee on Patents and the Patent Office for the 27th United States Congress.

Anti-dueling statute
While in the Senate, Prentiss was the originator and successful advocate of the law to suppress dueling in the District of Columbia.

Federal judicial service
Prentiss was nominated by President John Tyler on April 8, 1842, to a seat on the United States District Court for the District of Vermont vacated by Judge Elijah Paine. He was confirmed by the United States Senate on April 8, 1842, and received his commission the same day. His service terminated on January 15, 1857, due to his death in Montpelier. He was interred at Green Mount Cemetery in Montpelier.

Family

Samuel Prentiss was the fourth in his line to be named Samuel Prentiss.  He was the second of nine children born to Dr. Samuel Prentiss III and his wife Lucretia ( Holmes).  Two of his younger brothers also had notable political careers.  John Holmes Prentiss served two terms as a U.S. congressman from New York.  William A. Prentiss was the 10th mayor of Milwaukee, Wisconsin, and served in the Vermont House of Representatives and the Wisconsin State Assembly.

Their father, Dr. Samuel Prentiss was a prominent physician and served as a combat surgeon for his father, Colonel Samuel Prentice II, during the American Revolutionary War.  The Prentiss family were descendants of Captain Thomas Prentice, who emigrated from England to the Massachusetts Bay Colony in the 1640s and served as a captain during King Philip's War.

Samuel Prentiss IV married Lucretia Houghton (1786–1855), of Northfield, in 1804.  They had twelve children, though at least two died in infancy.  Their 8th child, Theodore Prentiss, moved to Wisconsin, became the first mayor of Watertown, Wisconsin, and also served in the Wisconsin State Assembly.

Notable law student
Among the lawyers who received their education and training in Prentiss's office was William Upham, who later served in the United States Senate.

Other service and honors
Prentiss was a trustee of Dartmouth College from 1820 to 1827; he received the honorary degrees of Artium Magister and Legum Doctor from Dartmouth in 1817 and 1832.

References

Sources

Books

Internet

External links
 
 
 
 
 

1782 births
1857 deaths
United States senators from Vermont
Members of the Vermont House of Representatives
Judges of the United States District Court for the District of Vermont
United States federal judges appointed by John Tyler
19th-century American judges
Vermont lawyers
People from Stonington, Connecticut
Chief Justices of the Vermont Supreme Court
Vermont Whigs
19th-century American politicians
Vermont National Republicans
National Republican Party United States senators
Burials at Green Mount Cemetery (Montpelier, Vermont)